Pseudacroclita is a genus of moths belonging to the family Tortricidae.

Species
Pseudacroclita hapalaspis (Meyrick, 1931)
Pseudacroclita luteispecula (Kuznetzov, 1979)

See also
List of Tortricidae genera

References

External links
tortricidae.com

Tortricidae genera
Olethreutinae